Julian Firth (born 8 January 1961) is an English actor, best known for his roles as troubled inmate Davis in the cinematic version of the film Scum and as Brother Jerome in the long-running television series Cadfael.

Firth has enjoyed a consistent acting career in the theatre and has appeared in numerous television productions, including Jeeves and Wooster, The Bill, The Young Indiana Jones Chronicles and Margaret. He also appeared in the video of the 1982 hit single Pass the Dutchie by Musical Youth, in which he appears as a pompous prosecuting barrister. In 1984, he was cast alongside Rob Lowe in Oxford Blues as Lowe's Oriel College room-mate and confidant, providing inside information. In 2011 he appeared in the television film The Suspicions of Mr Whicher for ITV. He also appeared in the drama The Queen in 2006, as Blair's aide. In 2017, Firth joined the cast of the HBO series Game of Thrones in Eastwatch, an episode of Season 7 as Archmaester Sandhu.

Personal life 
Firth grew up in Bristol, attending Elmlea Primary School, Clifton College, and Bristol Grammar School.

He was married to Gillian Melling. They had two sons, William Melling and Bruno Melling-Firth, and a daughter, Bella Honey Melling. Firth also has an older daughter Imogen Firth-Laliotis. In 2011, Bruno died at the age of 19 in a traffic accident while on a gap year in Thailand.

References

External links

Details of Cadfael on IMDB

People educated at Bristol Grammar School
1960 births
English male film actors
Living people
English male television actors
Male actors from London
English male stage actors
20th-century English male actors
21st-century English male actors